Brad Temkin (Chicago 1956) is an American photographer. He is known for his photographs documenting the human impact on the landscape.

Temkin's works are included in the permanent collections of the Art Institute of Chicago and Museum of Contemporary Photography. His images have appeared in such publications as Aperture, Black & White Magazine, Time magazine and European Photography.

His first book, Private Places: Photographs of Chicago Gardens, was published in 2005. He teaches photography at Columbia College Chicago.

Life and work
In 2009, he began a project entitled, Rooftop, addressing what contemporary urban pioneers are doing to mitigate the consequences of non-renewable energy consumption and drawing attention to living architecture.

Publications 
Private Places: Photographs of Chicago Gardens, Center for American Places/Columbia College, Chicago. 2005.
Rooftop, Radius Books, New Mexico, 2015
The State of Water, Radius Books, New Mexico, 2019.

Collections
Temkin's work is held in the following permanent public collections:
Art Institute of Chicago
Museum of Contemporary Photography

References

Further reading
"Ireland: A Troubled Mirror". Aperture. Issue No. 134 (1994)
European Photography. Issue No. 83, Summer, 2008
Earth Now: American Photographers and the Environment. Edited by Katherine Ware, University of New Mexico Press (2011)
"Fixing America by Fixing America". Time. Vol. 178, No 13 (2011)
"The Rise Of Living Architecture". Green Roofs For Healthy Cities. Toronto, ON (2012)

External links
Article at LensCulture
Interview at Daylight Books
Interview at PhotoVisa Festival
Interview at Domus Online Magazine
Interview with Susan Burnstine

1956 births
Living people
American photographers
People from Chicago